Francisco Velásquez (born February 12, 1990 in La Barra de Santiago, Ahuachapán), also known simply as Frank, is a Salvadoran beach soccer player.

He plays in forward position, and has won awards at the CONCACAF Beach Soccer Championship and FIFA Beach Soccer World Cup for his goalscoring abilities; he has appeared at four editions of the World Cup and scored his 100th goal for El Salvador during the 2021 tournament against Belarus.

Honours

Country
FIFA Beach Soccer World Cup
Fourth place (1): 2011
CONCACAF Beach Soccer Championship
Winner (2): 2009, 2021

Individual
FIFA Beach Soccer World Cup Bronze Ball (1): 2011
FIFA Beach Soccer World Cup Bronze Boot (1): 2011
FIFA Beach Soccer World Cup Goal of the Tournament (1): 2011 
CONCACAF Beach Soccer Championship Top Scorer (3): 2010, 2015, 2021
CONCACAF Beach Soccer Championship Best Player (1): 2010

References

External links

1990 births
Living people
Beach soccer players
Salvadoran footballers
El Salvador international footballers
People from Ahuachapán
Association football forwards